Diaphania guenealis is a moth in the family Crambidae. It was described by Snellen in 1875. It is found in Colombia, Venezuela, Ecuador, Peru, Belize and Mexico.

The length of the forewings is 15.5–17 mm for males and 14–16 mm for females. There is a terminal and costal band on the forewings. Both bands are brown. The internal edge of the anterior terminal band corresponds with the internal edge of the terminal band on the hindwings.

References

Moths described in 1875
Diaphania